Atwood Peter Collins, known as Porter Collins (born June 27, 1975 in New York City, New York), is an American rower. He finished 5th in the men's eight at the 1996 Summer Olympics and the 2000 Summer Olympics. He is also a three time world Champion in 1995, 1998 and 1999.

Collins worked as an analyst for the Morgan Stanley-owned hedge fund FrontPoint Partners during the United States housing bubble in the 2000s. FrontPoint, along with Collins and his colleagues including Steve Eisman, were the subject of Michael Lewis's book The Big Short due to the fund having correctly predicted the market crash in 2008. He was portrayed by Hamish Linklater in the film The Big Short, which was based on Lewis's book.

After leaving FrontPoint, Collins co-founded Seawolf Capital, a hedge fund, with Vincent Daniel, his former FrontPoint colleague. He also managed a portfolio for Citadel until 2019.

References

External links 
 

1975 births
Living people
Sportspeople from New York City
Rowers at the 1996 Summer Olympics
Rowers at the 2000 Summer Olympics
Olympic rowers of the United States
American male rowers
World Rowing Championships medalists for the United States